Alden Biesen is a 16th-century castle in Belgium, located in the small village of Rijkhoven in the municipality of Bilzen in the province of Limburg.

Present day
The castle is used today as a cultural centre and conference centre. Festivals such as the Scottish weekend or the International Story Festival are held there. In addition, "European Classes" take place, intended to foster international learning and collaboration between students. The first ever RSPBA Major Pipe Band Championship held outside the UK was the European Pipe Band Championships held there in September 2003.

In addition to the moated castle, the complex contains a church and gardens.

History
The knights of the Teutonic Order founded the Landcommanderij Alden Biesen ("commandery of Alden Biesen") in the 11th century, but the current buildings were constructed between the 16th and 18th centuries. It was the headquarters of a bailiwick or province of the Teutonic Order in the region of the Maas and Rhine. On 8 March 1971 the building burnt down and was acquired by the government and restored.

See also
List of castles in Belgium

References

Sources
 Landcommanderij Alden Biesen website

External links

Official site
Photo Gallery

Bilzen
Castles in Belgium
Castles of the Teutonic Knights
Castles in Limburg (Belgium)